María Isabel Rodríguez (born November 5, 1922) is a Salvadoran physician, academic, and government official. In 1956, she became one of the first group of four women to enter the Legislative Assembly. From 1999 to 2007, she was the rector of the University of El Salvador. She was appointed El Salvador's Minister of Health in 2009, a position she held until 2014. She is currently the Presidential Advisor on Health and Education.

Early life 
Rodríguez was born in San Salvador, El Salvador, on November 5, 1922. She earned her medical degree from the University of El Salvador in 1949 (despite being warned by the dean against joining such a "man's profession"). She completed postgraduate degrees in cardiology and physiological sciences in Mexico.

In 1954, she returned to her alma mater and began a career as cardiovascular physiologist and biomedical researcher.

Political career
In May 1956, she was elected to the Legislative Assembly, one of the first four women to enter the Legislative Assembly. However, she resigned from the Legislative Assembly in January 1957.

In 2009, she was appointed Minister of Health of El Salvador. Rodriguez has been credited for her role in establishing healthcare reform in that country.

At the end of her term in 2014, she was named Presidential Advisor on Health and Education, working to achieve universal health coverage and universal high-quality education in her country.

Academic career
In 1967, she was appointed Dean of the Faculty of Medicine of the University of El Salvador, a position she held until 1971. She left El Salvador in 1972 after the university faced military intervention (part of the run-up to the Salvadoran Civil War).

From 1972 to 1994, Rodríguez worked as a consultant for the Pan American Health Organization/World Health Organization, supporting the Representative Office in developing teaching and research centres, as well as health and science programs, in Latin American countries, including Mexico, the Dominican Republic, and Venezuela. From 1985 to 1994, she worked as a consultant for the International Health Training Program, based in Washington, D.C.

In 1994, Rodríguez returned to the University of El Salvador as an advisor and professor in the Faculty of Medicine. Over the course of her career, she authored over one hundred publications in the fields of biomedicine, medical education, international health, primary health care, and university policy.

In 1999, she was elected rector of the university, a position she held until 2007. She was the first woman to hold this position.

Awards and honours 
In 2015, the Pan American Health Organization/World Health Organization named her a Public Health Hero of the Americas, their highest distinction. She has been awarded honorary doctorates from at least 12 universities, including the University of Guadalajara and Central American University.

Personal life 
Rodríguez currently lives in San Salvador, El Salvador. She turned 100 in November 2022.

References 

1922 births
Living people
Salvadoran physicians
People from San Salvador
University of El Salvador alumni
Academic staff of University of El Salvador
Health ministers of El Salvador
Women government ministers of El Salvador
Members of the Legislative Assembly of El Salvador
Revolutionary Party of Democratic Unification politicians
20th-century Salvadoran women politicians
20th-century Salvadoran politicians
21st-century Salvadoran women politicians
21st-century Salvadoran politicians
Salvadoran centenarians
Women centenarians